Elections to the Manipur Legislative Assembly were held in March 1972 to elect members of the 60 constituencies in Manipur, India. The Indian National Congress won the most seats, but Mohammed Alimuddin of the Manipur Peoples Party was appointed as the Chief Minister of Manipur.

After the passing of the North-Eastern Areas (Reorganisation) Act, 1971, Manipur was converted from a Union Territory to a State. The size of its Legislative Assembly was increased from 30 to 60 members.

Result

Elected Members

See also 
 List of constituencies of the Manipur Legislative Assembly
 1972 elections in India

References

Manipur
1972
1972